Ajoy Kumar Dutta is an Indian social worker from the northeast Indian state of Assam. He is a Guwahati-based activist who is associated with several non governmental organizations working in the state. A former municipal  councillor at the Guwahati Municipal Corporation, he successfully contested the Assam Assembly Elections of 1978 as a Janata Party candidate defeating Nandeshwar Talukdar of the Communist Party of India by polling close to 34 percent of the total votes polled, and represented the Guwahati East constituency in the Assembly. The Government of India awarded him the fourth highest civilian honour of the Padma Shri, in 2016, for his contributions to society.

References

External links 
 

Recipients of the Padma Shri in social work
Year of birth missing (living people)
Politicians from Guwahati
Social workers
Janata Party politicians
Assam MLAs 1978–1983
20th-century Indian educators
Social workers from Assam
Living people